Liu Mei Ling is a Chinese lightweight rower.

At the 1995 World Rowing Championships, she came ninth in the lightweight double sculls. At the 1996 World Rowing Championships, she won gold in the lightweight four.

References

Chinese female rowers
Year of birth missing (living people)
World Rowing Championships medalists for China
Living people